Cleon John (born 25 October 1981) is a Trinidad and Tobago international footballer who plays for North East Stars, as a goalkeeper.

Career
John has played club football for San Juan Jabloteh and North East Stars.

He made his international debut for Trinidad and Tobago in 2013.

References

1981 births
Living people
Trinidad and Tobago footballers
Trinidad and Tobago international footballers
Association football goalkeepers
San Juan Jabloteh F.C. players
North East Stars F.C. players
TT Pro League players